Harry Jefferson (born November 2, 1946) is a retired NASCAR Winston Cup Series whose career spanned from 1973 to 1977.

Career
In addition to his Cup Series career, Jefferson also raced in the Winston West Series in a 1973 Mercury Cougar vehicle. That vehicle would eventually be refurbished into a 1979 Ford Granada and driven by NASCAR legends such as Derrike Cope, David Pearson, and Bobby Allison. This driver has also earned a grand total of $20,268 in total prize winnings ($ when adjusted for inflation) after starting an average of 18th place and finishing an average of 24th place. His only DNQs were at the 1972 Miller High Life 500 and at the 1988 Checker 500.

Harry also enjoyed a very successful career in the late model Sportsman series in the Pacific Northwest.

References

External Links
 

1946 births
NASCAR drivers
People from Yakima County, Washington
Living people
Racing drivers from Washington (state)